Jonathan Bibi (born 28 July 1984) is a Seychellois football player. He is a defender on the Seychelles national football team.

Bibi helped Seychelles win the football tournament at the 2011 Indian Ocean Games in August 2011.

References

External links

 

1984 births
Living people
Seychellois footballers
Association football defenders
Seychelles international footballers